Nanula is a genus of sea snails, marine gastropod mollusks in the family Trochidae, the top snails.

Distribution
The species in this genus are endemic to Australia and occur off New South Wales, South Australia, Tasmania, Victoria and Western Australia.

Species
 Nanula flindersi Cotton, B.C. & F.K. Godfrey, 1935
 Nanula galbina (Hedley, C. & W.L. May, 1908)
 Nanula tasmanica Petterd, W.F., 1879

References

 Thiele, 1924, Mitteilungen aus dem Zoologischen Museum in Berlin, 11(1): 54, 69
 Cotton, B.C. (1959). South Australian Mollusca. Archaeogastropoda . Adelaide : South Australian Government Printer.
 Iredale, T. & McMichael, D.F. (1962). A reference list of the marine Mollusca of New South Wales. Memoirs of the Australian Museum. 11

External links
 To ITIS
 To World Register of Marine Species

 
Trochidae
Gastropod genera